Świerkówko is a settlement in the administrative district of Gmina Koczała, within Człuchów County, Pomeranian Voivodeship, in northern Poland.

For details of the history of the region, see History of Pomerania.

References

Villages in Człuchów County